NGC 1436 (also called NGC 1437) is a barred spiral galaxy approximately 58 million light-years away from Earth in the constellation of Eridanus. It is a member of the Fornax I cluster.

Observational history 

This galaxy was entered twice in the New General Catalogue, first as NGC 1436 and after that as NGC 1437. It was discovered by John Herschel on January 9, 1836, who described it as "very bright, and evidently a globular cluster".  It later received designation NGC 1436. It was also observed by Scottish astronomer James Dunlop with his 9" reflector at Parramatta, who described it as "a pretty large faint round nebula, about 3.5' diameter, gradual slight condensation to the centre, very faint at the margin".

John Herschel observed this object again on November 28, 1837, assumed it was new and measured an accurate position.  It later received second designation in the New General Catalogue (NGC 1437) because of that.

Until recently this galaxy was often called NGC 1437, but in recent references it is being called NGC 1436 more and more frequently.

See also 
 Types and morphology of galaxies  
 List of NGC objects (1001–2000)
 Eridanus (constellation)

References

External links 

 

Barred spiral galaxies
Eridanus (constellation)
1436
13687
Astronomical objects discovered in 1836
Discoveries by John Herschel
Fornax Cluster